Nili Abramski (born 14 January 1970, Rehovot, Israel) is an Israeli long-distance runner.

Career highlights

Marathons
2004 - Athens, 42nd at 2004 Summer Olympics
2005 - Helsinki, 49th at World Championships
2006 - Göteborg, 22nd at European Championships
2007 - Osaka, 41st at World Championships
Holds 10 Israeli national marathon titles
Half Marathons
1997 - 8th at World University Games
1997 - Košice, 70th at World Championships
1999 - Palermo, 54th at World Championships
2000 - Veracruz, 44th at World Championships
2001 - Bristol, 48th at World Championships
2002 - Brussels, 39th at World Championships
2005 - Edmonton, 55th at World Championships
Cross Country Races
1997 - Torino, 134th at World Championships (long race)
1999 - Belfast, 80th at World Championships (long race)
Other achievements
Holds 45 other Israeli national titles
She won the Tiberias Marathon 11 times

Personal bests

External links
 

Living people
1970 births
Israeli female middle-distance runners
Israeli female long-distance runners
Israeli female marathon runners
Olympic athletes of Israel
Athletes (track and field) at the 2004 Summer Olympics
World Athletics Championships athletes for Israel